Shanta Das Manandhar is a pioneer of children's literature in Nepal. He has published more than 24 children's books.  Two of the books were published in English around 2015 BS (1958–59 AD); one of them was titled Some Essays. He has also translated English fairy tales into Nepali language.

He was born in Jhochen, Kathmandu and schooled in JP school, and has completed Bachelor level. He worked as a teacher in Santi Bidyagriha of Lainchaur and worked as a principal in Bal Sewa Bidhyashram for 8 years. Though he has suffered from heart attack twice, he is still active in writing for various newspapers for children's columns.

List of awards
Jagadamba Shree Purasakar in 2018 
 Devkota Lu Xun Pragya Puraskar in 2018

References

Further reading

External links
 Interview in Nepali language. 

Nepalese male novelists
Living people
Jagadamba Shree Puraskar winners
1934 births
Nepalese children's writers
Newar people
People from Kathmandu